Earnshaw may refer to:

People 

 Adrian Earnshaw, Manx politician
 Anthony Earnshaw, English anarchist and writer
 Brian Earnshaw, Welsh writer
 Eleri Earnshaw, Welsh footballer
 Ernie Earnshaw, American musician
 George Earnshaw, American baseball player
 Harry Earnshaw (cyclist), English racing cyclist
 Isaac Earnshaw (1859–1914), Australian racehorse trainer
 John Earnshaw (1900–82), Australian engineer, inventor and historian
 Laurence Earnshaw, English mechanician
 Manuel Earnshaw, Filipino businessman and politician
 Reginald Earnshaw, English soldier
 Robert Earnshaw, Welsh footballer
 Richard Earnshaw, English cricketer
 Russell Earnshaw, English rugby union player
 Samuel Earnshaw, English cleric
 Thomas Earnshaw, English watchmaker
 Tina Earnshaw, make-up artist
 William Earnshaw (politician), New Zealand member of parliament
 William Earnshaw (minister), American minister
 William C. Earnshaw, professor of chromosome dynamics
 Wilson Earnshaw, English cricketer

Fictional characters 

 The main family in the 1847 novel Wuthering Heights, which includes:
 Catherine Earnshaw, the female protagonist of Wuthering Heights
 Hareton Earnshaw, Catherine's nephew 
 Hindley Earnshaw, Catherine's brother and Hareton's father

Places 

 Earnshaw, West Virginia, USA
 Earnshaw State College, Queensland, Australia
 Earnshaw Glacier, Antarctica

English-language surnames
English toponymic surnames
Surnames of Old English origin